The 1980 Copa Fraternidad was the 10th edition of the Central American football club championship organized by UNCAF, the regional governing body of Central America.

Broncos won their first title by defeating Alianza and FAS in the final round.  Aurora won the previous tournament, but did not qualify for this tournament and were unable to defend their title.

Teams
Only El Salvador, Guatemala and Honduras sent representatives.

First round

Second round

Final Round

Champion

See also
 1980 CONCACAF Champions' Cup

References

1980
Copa Fraternidad